Someone may refer to:

Literature
 Someone (Edwards novel), a 2014 novel by A.M. Edwards
 Someone (McDermott novel), a 2013 novel by Alice McDermott

Songs
 "Someone" (Lee Greenwood song), 1987
 "Someone" (The Rembrandts song), 1991
 "Someone" (SWV song), 1997
 "Someone (Laissons nous une chance)", by Hanson and Emma Daumas, 2005
 "Someone" (Lucy Spraggan song), 2012
 "Someone" (Kelly Clarkson song), 2015
 "Someone", from More Johnny's Greatest Hits, 1959
 "Someone", by Air Supply from News from Nowhere, 1995
 "Someone", by Earshot from Two, 2004
 "Someone", by Jolin Tsai from Muse, 2012
 "Someone", by The Mekons from The Mekons Rock 'n Roll, 1989

Other uses
 Someone (film), a 2016 Japanese film

See also
 Somebody (disambiguation)
 Indefinite pronoun